

List
Cities and urban localities with a population of higher than 20,000 are listed below.

Note that the first three population columns are based on censuses, while the last column is from an estimate.

See also

 Palestinian refugee camps in Jordan
 Zaatari refugee camp
 Mrajeeb Al Fhood refugee camp
 List of twin towns and sister cities in Jordan
 Governorates of Jordan
 Districts of Jordan

References

External links

 
Jordan, List of cities in
Cities